Stan is a probabilistic programming language for statistical inference written in C++. The Stan language is used to specify a (Bayesian) statistical model with an imperative program calculating the log probability density function.

Stan is licensed under the New BSD License. Stan is named in honour of Stanislaw Ulam, pioneer of the Monte Carlo method.

Stan was created by a development team consisting of 34 members that includes Andrew Gelman, Bob Carpenter, Matt Hoffman, and Daniel Lee.

Interfaces 
The Stan language itself can be accessed through several interfaces:
 CmdStan – a command-line executable for the shell,
 CmdStanR and rstan – R software libraries,
 CmdStanPy and PyStan – libraries for the Python programming language,
 MatlabStan – integration with the MATLAB numerical computing environment,
 Stan.jl – integration with the Julia programming language,
 StataStan – integration with Stata.

In addition, higher-level interfaces are provided with packages using Stan as backend, primarily in the R language:

 rstanarm provides a drop-in replacement for frequentist models provided by base R and lme4 using the R formula syntax;
 brms provides a wide array of linear and nonlinear models using the R formula syntax;
 prophet provides automated procedures for time series forecasting.

Algorithms 
Stan implements gradient-based Markov chain Monte Carlo (MCMC) algorithms for Bayesian inference, stochastic, gradient-based variational Bayesian methods for approximate Bayesian inference, and gradient-based optimization for penalized maximum likelihood estimation. 
 MCMC algorithms:
 Hamiltonian Monte Carlo (HMC)
 No-U-Turn sampler (NUTS), a variant of HMC and Stan's default MCMC engine
 Variational inference algorithms:
 Automatic Differentiation Variational Inference
 Optimization algorithms:
 Limited-memory BFGS (Stan's default optimization algorithm)
 Broyden–Fletcher–Goldfarb–Shanno algorithm 
 Laplace's method for classical standard error estimates and approximate Bayesian posteriors

Automatic differentiation 
Stan implements reverse-mode automatic differentiation to calculate gradients of the model, which is required by HMC, NUTS, L-BFGS, BFGS, and variational inference. The automatic differentiation within Stan can be used outside of the probabilistic programming language.

Usage 
Stan is used in fields including social science, pharmaceutical statistics, market research, and medical imaging.

References

Further reading 
 
 Gelman, Andrew, Daniel Lee, and Jiqiang Guo (2015).  Stan: A probabilistic programming language for Bayesian inference and optimization, Journal of Educational and Behavioral Statistics.
 Hoffman, Matthew D., Bob Carpenter, and Andrew Gelman (2012). Stan, scalable software for Bayesian modeling , Proceedings of the NIPS Workshop on Probabilistic Programming.

External links 
 Stan web site
 Stan source, a Git repository hosted on GitHub

Computational statistics
Free Bayesian statistics software
Monte Carlo software
Numerical programming languages
Domain-specific programming languages
Probabilistic software